The Editorial Universitaria de Buenos Aires, doing business as Eudeba, is the university press of the University of Buenos Aires, the largest university press in Argentina and one of the largest in Latin America.

It was founded in 1958, taking over from the university's Editorial Department, on initiative of UBA rector Risieri Frondizi. Initially a State-owned enterprise, it later became a mixed-economy enterprise, with 99% of its assets belonging to the Argentine government. Its first president was José Babini, and its first general manager was Boris Spivacow. Eudeba published 10 million titles during Spivacow's management, which lasted from the press's foundation to the 1966 coup d'état.

During the last military dictatorship in Argentina (1976–1983), the university's research production and curricula were subject to systemic censorship, and hundreds upon thousands of books were burned (including up to 90,000 books published by Eudeba). Many of them have since been re-published by the press following the return of democracy in 1983.

References

External links
 

1958 establishments in Argentina
Book publishing companies of Argentina
University presses of Argentina
University of Buenos Aires
Publishing companies established in 1958
Companies based in Buenos Aires
Academic publishing companies